Aaron Hunt (born June 19, 1980, in Denison, Texas) is a professional Canadian football defensive tackle who most recently played for the Montreal Alouettes of the Canadian Football League.

College football career 
Hunt attended Texas Tech University and played for the Texas Tech Red Raiders football team.

Professional football career

Denver Broncos
In 2003, Hunt was selected in the 6th round (194th overall) by the Denver Broncos in the 2003 NFL Draft. He was released by Denver on September 4, 2003.

Arizona Cardinals
Hunt spent the last 3 weeks of the 2003 season on the Arizona Cardinals practice squad.

Miami Dolphins
In 2004, Hunt spent training camp with the Miami Dolphins but was waived on August 27.

Denver Broncos (Hamburg Sea Devils)
In 2005, Hunt re-signed with the Broncos in March 2005 and spent a season in NFL Europa. There, he played with the Hamburg Sea Devils and recorded 3 sacks and 23 total tackles. Hunt was waived by Denver on August 27.

BC Lions
In May 2006, Hunt was signed as a free agent by the BC Lions of the Canadian Football League and had a great first year. Hunt won the CFL's Most Outstanding Rookie Award and Jackie Parker Trophy for best rookie in the West Division.  Hunt was named a 2006 West Division All-Star, and was a member of the Lions 2006 Grey Cup championship team.

Montreal Alouettes

After becoming a free agent in 2012, Hunt signed with the Montreal Alouettes on February 21, 2012. Hunt was released by Montreal on July 24, 2012, after four games, recording 4 tackles and 0 sacks in that span.

Personal life
Hunt is the younger brother of linebacker Reggie Hunt. The elder Hunt retired in 2011 after stints with the Edmonton Eskimos, Montreal Alouettes and Saskatchewan Roughriders.

References

External links
Just Sports Stats
Montreal Alouettes bio

1980 births
Living people
American football defensive linemen
American players of Canadian football
Arizona Cardinals players
BC Lions players
Canadian football defensive linemen
Denver Broncos players
Hamburg Sea Devils players
Montreal Alouettes players
People from Denison, Texas
Players of American football from Texas
Texas Tech Red Raiders football players
Canadian Football League Rookie of the Year Award winners